This was the first edition of the tournament.

Pedro Sousa won the title after defeating Jan-Lennard Struff 6–1, 6–3 in the final.

Seeds

Draw

Finals

Top half

Bottom half

References
Main Draw
Qualifying Draw

IsarOpen - Singles